Mohamed Ryad Garidi (born 20 December 1977) is an Algerian rower. He competed in the men's lightweight double sculls event at the 2008 Summer Olympics.

References

External links
 

1977 births
Living people
Algerian male rowers
Olympic rowers of Algeria
Rowers at the 2008 Summer Olympics
Sportspeople from Algiers
21st-century Algerian people